The 2010–11 Boston Celtics season was the 65th season of the Boston Celtics in the National Basketball Association (NBA). The Celtics were coming off of an NBA Finals loss to their rivals, the Los Angeles Lakers, in seven games.

On June 30, 2010, Doc Rivers announced that he would return to coach the Celtics after speculating that he would resign in order to spend time with his family.

With the off-season acquisitions of former all-stars Shaquille O'Neal and Jermaine O'Neal, the Celtics started the year at 41–14 and were on top of the Eastern Conference standings during the All-Star break. However, after center Kendrick Perkins, who was working his way back from a torn ACL in last year's Finals, was traded to the Oklahoma City Thunder mid-season, the Celtics only won 15 of their final 27 games. Still, they managed a 56–26 record and enter the playoffs as the 3rd seed in the Eastern Conference.

In the playoffs, they swept the New York Knicks in the first round to advance to the Conference Semifinals, where they faced the Miami Heat. The Celtics had defeated the Heat in five games in last season's First Round, after which the Heat had added LeBron James and Chris Bosh to join Dwyane Wade. The new-look Heat proved too much for the Celtics and easily won the series in five games, knocking Boston out of the playoffs. Following the season, Shaquille O'Neal retired after playing 19 seasons in the league.

The Big Four of Kevin Garnett, Paul Pierce, Ray Allen, Rajon Rondo and coach Rivers represented the Eastern Conference in the 2011 NBA All-Star Game in Los Angeles.

Key dates 

 June 24 – The 2010 NBA draft was held in New York City.
 July 1 – The free agency period started.
 October 26 – The regular season started with an 88–80 win over the media-hyped Miami Heat.

Summary

NBA Draft 2010

Draft picks

Roster

Pre-season

Game log 

|- style="background:#cfc;"
| 1
| October 6
| Philadelphia
| 
| Ray Allen (14)
| Ray Allen (8)
| Rajon Rondo (7)
| Verizon Wireless Arena10,038
| 1–0
|- style="background:#cfc;"
| 2
| October 7
| @ New Jersey
| 
| Glen Davis (20)
| Paul Pierce,Delonte West (6)
| Rajon Rondo (7)
| Prudential Center8,483
| 2–0
|- style="background:#cfc;"
| 3
| October 10
| Toronto
| 
| Nate Robinson (13)
| Kevin Garnett (6)
| Rajon Rondo (7)
| TD Garden18,624
| 3–0
|- style="background:#fbb;"
| 4
| October 12
| @ Philadelphia
| 
| Nate Robinson (26)
| Jermaine O'Neal (12)
| Nate Robinson (8)
| Wells Fargo Center7,835
| 3–1
|- style="background:#cfc;"
| 5
| October 13
| @ New York
| 
| Ray Allen (24)
| Kevin Garnett (9)
| Rajon Rondo (7)
| Madison Square Garden19,763
| 4–1
|- style="background:#cfc;"
| 6
| October 15
| @ Toronto
| 
| Nate Robinson (23)
| Semih Erden (8)
| Rajon Rondo (5)
| Air Canada Centre13,763
| 5–1
|- style="background:#cfc;"
| 7
| October 16
| New York
| 
| Kevin Garnett (20)
| Rajon Rondo (8)
| Rajon Rondo (9)
| XL Center15,318
| 6–1
|- style="background:#cfc;"
| 8
| October 20
| New Jersey
| 
| Paul Pierce (17)
| Shaquille O'Neal (9)
| Rajon Rondo (12)
| TD Garden18,624
| 7–1
|-

Regular season

Standings

Record vs. opponents

Game log 

|- style="background:#cfc;"
| 1
| October 26
| Miami
| 
| Ray Allen (20)
| Kevin Garnett (10)
| Rajon Rondo (17)
| TD Garden18,624
| 1–0
|- style="background:#fcc;"
| 2
| October 27
| @ Cleveland
| 
| Rajon Rondo (18)
| Kevin Garnett (15)
| Rajon Rondo (9)
| Quicken Loans Arena20,562
| 1–1
|- style="background:#cfc;"
| 3
| October 29
| New York
| 
| Paul Pierce (25)
| Paul Pierce (14)
| Rajon Rondo (24)
| TD Garden18,624
| 2–1

|- style="background:#cfc;"
| 4
| November 2
| @ Detroit
| 
| Kevin Garnett (22)
| Kevin Garnett (6)
| Rajon Rondo (17)
| The Palace of Auburn Hills15,313
| 3–1
|- style="background:#cfc;"
| 5
| November 3
| Milwaukee
| 
| Paul Pierce (28)
| Rajon Rondo,Kevin Garnett (8)
| Rajon Rondo (15)
| TD Garden18,624
| 4–1
|- style="background:#cfc;"
| 6
| November 5
| Chicago
| 
| Ray Allen (25)
| Kevin Garnett (10)
| Rajon Rondo (11)
| TD Garden18,624
| 5–1
|- style="background:#cfc;"
| 7
| November 7
| @ Oklahoma City
| 
| Ray Allen (19)
| Jermaine O'Neal (9)
| Rajon Rondo (10)
| Oklahoma City Arena18,203
| 6–1
|- style="background:#fcc;"
| 8
| November 8
| @ Dallas
| 
| Paul Pierce (24)
| Kevin Garnett (15)
| Rajon Rondo (15)
| American Airlines Center20,194
| 6–2
|- style="background:#cfc;"
| 9
| November 11
| @ Miami
| 
| Ray Allen (35)
| Kevin Garnett (13)
| Rajon Rondo (16)
| American Airlines Arena19,650
| 7–2
|- style="background:#cfc;"
| 10
| November 13
| @ Memphis
| 
| Paul Pierce (28)
| Kevin Garnett (9)
| Rajon Rondo (17)
| FedExForum18,119
| 8–2
|- style="background:#cfc;"
| 11
| November 17
| Washington
| 
| Paul Pierce (23)
| Glen Davis (8)
| Rajon Rondo (13)
| TD Garden18,624
| 9–2
|- style="background:#fcc;"
| 12
| November 19
| Oklahoma City
| 
| Kevin Garnett (16)
| Shaquille O'Neal,Paul Pierce (6)
| Rajon Rondo (7)
| TD Garden18,624
| 9–3
|- style="background:#fcc;"
| 13
| November 21
| @ Toronto
| 
| Nate Robinson (22)
| Kevin Garnett,Ray Allen (8)
| Paul Pierce (5)
| Air Canada Centre17,707
| 9–4
|- style="background:#cfc;"
| 14
| November 22
| @ Atlanta
| 
| Kevin Garnett (17)
| Kevin Garnett,Shaquille O'Neal (11)
| Nate Robinson (10)
| Philips Arena14,476
| 10–4
|- style="background:#cfc;"
| 15
| November 24
| New Jersey
| 
| Shaquille O'Neal (25)
| Shaquille O'Neal (11)
| Ray Allen (7)
| TD Garden18,624
| 11–4
|- style="background:#cfc;"
| 16
| November 26
| Toronto
| 
| Kevin Garnett (26)
| Kevin Garnett (11)
| Rajon Rondo (14)
| TD Garden18,624
| 12–4
|- style="background:#cfc;"
| 17
| November 30
| @ Cleveland
| 
| Rajon Rondo (23)
| Glen Davis (11)
| Rajon Rondo (12)
| Quicken Loans Arena20,562
| 13–4

|- style="background:#cfc;"
| 18
| December 1
| Portland
| 
| Paul Pierce (28)
| Kevin Garnett (8)
| Rajon Rondo (10)
| TD Garden18,624
| 14–4
|- style="background:#cfc;"
| 19
| December 3
| Chicago
| 
| Kevin Garnett (20)
| Kevin Garnett (17)
| Rajon Rondo (19)
| TD Garden18,624
| 15–4
|- style="background:#cfc;"
| 20
| December 5
| @ New Jersey
| 
| Nate Robinson (21)
| Kevin Garnett (14)
| Nate Robinson (6)
| Prudential Center16,196
| 16–4
|- style="background:#cfc;"
| 21
| December 8
| Denver
| 
| Ray Allen (28)
| Kevin Garnett (9)
| Rajon Rondo (13)
| TD Garden18,624
| 17–4
|- style="background:#cfc;"
| 22
| December 9
| @ Philadelphia
| 
| Ray Allen (23)
| Paul Pierce (8)
| Rajon Rondo (14)
| Wells Fargo Center17,948
| 18–4
|- style="background:#cfc;"
| 23
| December 11
| @ Charlotte
| 
| Ray Allen,Glen Davis (16)
| Kevin Garnett (11)
| Rajon Rondo (8)
| Time Warner Cable Arena19,603
| 19–4
|- style="background:#cfc;"
| 24
| December 15
| @ New York
| 
| Paul Pierce (32)
| Kevin Garnett (13)
| Rajon Rondo (14)
| Madison Square Garden19,763
| 20–4
|- style="background:#cfc;"
| 25
| December 16
| Atlanta
| 
| Ray Allen,Glen Davis (18)
| Kevin Garnett (14)
| Paul Pierce (10)
| TD Garden18,624
| 21–4
|- style="background:#cfc;"
| 26
| December 19
| Indiana
| 
| Glen Davis,Paul Pierce,Nate Robinson (18)
| Paul Pierce (10)
| Paul Pierce (12)
| TD Garden18,624
| 22–4
|- style="background:#cfc;"
| 27
| December 22
| Philadelphia
| 
| Ray Allen (22)
| Shaquille O'Neal (9)
| Ray Allen (6)
| TD Garden18,624
| 23–4
|- style="background:#fcc;"
| 28
| December 25
| @ Orlando
| 
| Kevin Garnett (22)
| Glen Davis,Paul Pierce (8)
| Paul Pierce (5)
| Amway Center19,013
| 23–5
|- style="background:#cfc;"
| 29
| December 28
| @ Indiana
| 
| Paul Pierce (21)
| Kevin Garnett (13)
| Paul Pierce (7)
| Conseco Fieldhouse18,165
| 24–5
|- style="background:#fcc;"
| 30
| December 29
| @ Detroit
| 
| Paul Pierce (33)
| Ray Allen (7)
| Paul Pierce (8)
| The Palace of Auburn Hills22,076
| 24–6
|- style="background:#fcc;"
| 31
| December 31
| New Orleans
| 
| Ray Allen (18)
| Paul Pierce (7)
| Ray Allen,Marquis Daniels (4)
| TD Garden18,624
| 24–7

|- style="background:#cfc;"
| 32
| January 2
| @ Toronto
| 
| Paul Pierce (30)
| Glen Davis (11)
| Glen Davis,Rajon Rondo (8)
| Air Canada Centre19,986
| 25–7
|- style="background:#cfc;"
| 33
| January 3
| Minnesota
| 
| Paul Pierce (23)
| Paul Pierce,Von Wafer (6)
| Rajon Rondo (16)
| TD Garden18,624
| 26–7
|- style="background:#cfc;"
| 34
| January 5
| San Antonio
| 
| Ray Allen (31)
| Rajon Rondo (10)
| Rajon Rondo (22)
| TD Garden18,624
| 27–7
|- style="background:#cfc;"
| 35
| January 7
| Toronto
| 
| Paul Pierce (20)
| Luke Harangody (11)
| Rajon Rondo (7)
| TD Garden18,624
| 28–7
|- style="background:#fcc;"
| 36
| January 8
| @ Chicago
| 
| Paul Pierce (21)
| Rajon Rondo (5)
| Rajon Rondo (8)
| United Center22,663
| 28–8
|- style="background:#fcc;"
| 37
| January 10
| Houston
| 
| Ray Allen,Marquis Daniels (19)
| Ray Allen,Marquis Daniels (7)
| Rajon Rondo (12)
| TD Garden18,624
| 28–9
|- style="background:#cfc;"
| 38
| January 12
| Sacramento
| 
| Paul Pierce (25)
| Semih Erden (9)
| Rajon Rondo (13)
| TD Garden18,624
| 29–9
|- style="background:#cfc;"
| 39
| January 14
| Charlotte
| 
| Shaquille O'Neal (23)
| Rajon Rondo (6)
| Rajon Rondo (13)
| TD Garden18,624
| 30–9
|- style="background:#cfc;"
| 40
| January 17
| Orlando
| 
| Ray Allen (26)
| Kevin Garnett (8)
| Rajon Rondo (13)
| TD Garden18,624
| 31–9
|- style="background:#cfc;"
| 41
| January 19
| Detroit
| 
| Paul Pierce (22)
| Shaquille O'Neal (12)
| Rajon Rondo (8)
| TD Garden18,624
| 32–9
|- style="background:#cfc;"
| 42
| January 21
| Utah
| 
| Kevin Garnett (21)
| Glen Davis,Semih Erden (7)
| Rajon Rondo (12)
| TD Garden18,624
| 33–9
|- style="background:#fcc;"
| 43
| January 22
| @ Washington
| 
| Kevin Garnett (17)
| Semih Erden (11)
| Rajon Rondo (9)
| Verizon Center20,278
| 33–10
|- style="background:#cfc;"
| 44
| January 25
| Cleveland
| 
| Paul Pierce (24)
| Semih Erden (8)
| Rajon Rondo (10)
| TD Garden18,624
| 34–10
|- style="background:#cfc;"
| 45
| January 27
| @ Portland
| 
| Ray Allen (18)
| Kevin Garnett,Kendrick Perkins (9)
| Kevin Garnett (9)
| Rose Garden20,706
| 35–10
|- style="background:#fcc;"
| 46
| January 28
| @ Phoenix
| 
| Kevin Garnett (18)
| Kevin Garnett (9)
| Rajon Rondo (6)
| US Airways Center18,422
| 35–11
|- style="background:#cfc;"
| 47
| January 30
| @ L.A. Lakers
| 
| Paul Pierce (32)
| Kevin Garnett (13)
| Rajon Rondo (16)
| Staples Center18,997
| 36–11

|- style="background:#cfc;"
| 48
| February 1
| @ Sacramento
| 
| Ray Allen (22)
| Kendrick Perkins (10)
| Rajon Rondo (10)
| ARCO Arena16,482
| 37–11
|- style="background:#fcc;"
| 49
| February 4
| Dallas
| 
| Ray Allen (24)
| Kendrick Perkins (12)
| Rajon Rondo (12)
| TD Garden18,624
| 37–12
|- style="background:#cfc;"
| 50
| February 6
| Orlando
| 
| Rajon Rondo (26)
| Kendrick Perkins (13)
| Rajon Rondo (7)
| TD Garden18,624
| 38–12
|- style="background:#fcc;"
| 51
| February 7
| @ Charlotte
| 
| Ray Allen (25)
| Kevin Garnett (14)
| Rajon Rondo (14)
| Time Warner Cable Arena19,081
| 38–13
|- style="background:#fcc;"
| 52
| February 10
| L.A. Lakers
| 
| Ray Allen (20)
| Kevin Garnett (11)
| Rajon Rondo (10)
| TD Garden18,624
| 38–14
|- style="background:#cfc;"
| 53
| February 13
| Miami
| 
| Kevin Garnett (19)
| Rajon Rondo (10)
| Rajon Rondo (10)
| TD Garden18,624
| 39–14
|- style="background:#cfc;"
| 54
| February 16
| New Jersey
| 
| Paul Pierce (31)
| Kevin Garnett (10)
| Rajon Rondo (8)
| TD Garden18,624
| 40–14
|- style="text-align:center;"
| colspan="9" style="background:#bbcaff;"|All-Star Break
|- style="background:#cfc;"
| 55
| February 22
| @ Golden State
| 
| Kevin Garnett (24)
| Kevin Garnett (12)
| Rajon Rondo (15)
| Oracle Arena19,738
| 41–14
|- style="background:#fcc;"
| 56
| February 24
| @ Denver
| 
| Paul Pierce (17)
| Kevin Garnett (13)
| Rajon Rondo (8)
| Pepsi Center18,524
| 41–15
|- style="background:#cfc;"
| 57
| February 26
| @ L.A. Clippers
| 
| Paul Pierce (24)
| Kevin Garnett (11)
| Rajon Rondo (11)
| Staples Center19,513
| 42–15
|- style="background:#cfc;"
| 58
| February 28
| @ Utah
| 
| Ray Allen (25)
| Kevin Garnett (14)
| Rajon Rondo (11)
| EnergySolutions Arena19,911
| 43–15

|- style="background:#cfc;"
| 59
| March 2
| Phoenix
| 
| Kevin Garnett (28)
| Paul Pierce (13)
| Rajon Rondo (15)
| TD Garden18,624
| 44–15
|- style="background:#cfc;"
| 60
| March 4
| Golden State
| 
| Ray Allen,Paul Pierce (27)
| Paul Pierce (7)
| Rajon Rondo (16)
| TD Garden18,624
| 45–15
|- style="background:#cfc;"
| 61
| March 6
| @ Milwaukee
| 
| Paul Pierce (23)
| Kevin Garnett (11)
| Rajon Rondo (8)
| Bradley Center16,110
| 46–15
|- style="background:#fcc;"
| 62
| March 9
| L.A. Clippers
| 
| Ray Allen (23)
| Nenad Krstić (9)
| Rajon Rondo (9)
| TD Garden18,624
| 46–16
|- style="background:#fcc;"
| 63
| March 11
| @ Philadelphia
| 
| Jeff Green (18)
| Nenad Krstić (15)
| Kevin Garnett,Paul Pierce,Rajon Rondo (5)
| Wells Fargo Center20,614
| 46–17
|- style="background:#cfc;"
| 64
| March 13
| Milwaukee
| 
| Ray Allen (17)
| Nenad Krstić (14)
| Carlos Arroyo (6)
| TD Garden18,624
| 47–17
|- style="background:#fcc;"
| 65
| March 14
| @ New Jersey
| 
| Ray Allen (19)
| Glen Davis (14)
| Rajon Rondo (9)
| Prudential Center18,711
| 47–18
|- style="background:#cfc;"
| 66
| March 16
| Indiana
| 
| Paul Pierce (20)
| Glen Davis (9)
| Rajon Rondo (8)
| TD Garden18,624
| 48–18
|- style="background:#fcc;"
| 67
| March 18
| @ Houston
| 
| Jeff Green (17)
| Glen Davis (7)
| Rajon Rondo (6)
| Toyota Center18,412
| 48–19
|- style="background:#cfc;"
| 68
| March 19
| @ New Orleans
| 
| Ray Allen,Glen Davis (20)
| Kevin Garnett (9)
| Paul Pierce (6)
| New Orleans Arena18,018
| 49–19
|- style="background:#cfc;"
| 69
| March 21
| @ New York
| 
| Kevin Garnett (24)
| Kevin Garnett (11)
| Rajon Rondo (12)
| Madison Square Garden19,763
| 50–19
|- style="background:#fcc;"
| 70
| March 23
| Memphis
| 
| Paul Pierce (22)
| Rajon Rondo (11)
| Rajon Rondo (11)
| TD Garden18,624
| 50–20
|- style="background:#fcc;"
| 71
| March 25
| Charlotte
| 
| Paul Pierce (18)
| Kevin Garnett (9)
| Rajon Rondo (5)
| TD Garden18,624
| 50–21
|- style="background:#cfc;"
| 72
| March 27
| @ Minnesota
| 
| Paul Pierce (23)
| Kevin Garnett (13)
| Kevin Garnett,Delonte West (5)
| Target Center19,178
| 51–21
|- style="background:#fcc;"
| 73
| March 28
| @ Indiana
| 
| Paul Pierce (23)
| Kevin Garnett,Paul Pierce (6)
| Rajon Rondo (9)
| Conseco Fieldhouse15,932
| 51–22
|- style="background:#cfc;"
| 74
| March 31
| @ San Antonio
| 
| Rajon Rondo (22)
| Paul Pierce (11)
| Rajon Rondo (14)
| AT&T Center18,583
| 52–22

|- style="background:#fcc;"
| 75
| April 1
| @ Atlanta
| 
| Paul Pierce (25)
| Kevin Garnett,Rajon Rondo (10)
| Kevin Garnett,Rajon Rondo,Delonte West (5)
| Philips Arena19,763
| 52–23
|- style="background:#cfc;"
| 76
| April 3
| Detroit
| 
| Kevin Garnett (23)
| Kevin Garnett (8)
| Rajon Rondo (14)
| TD Garden18,624
| 53–23
|- style="background:#cfc;"
| 77
| April 5
| Philadelphia
| 
| Paul Pierce (18)
| Jeff Green,Paul Pierce (7)
| Rajon Rondo (13)
| TD Garden18,624
| 54–23
|- style="background:#fcc;"
| 78
| April 7
| @ Chicago
| 
| Paul Pierce (15)
| Kevin Garnett (10)
| Rajon Rondo (6)
| United Center23,067
| 54–24
|- style="background:#cfc;"
| 79
| April 8
| Washington
| 
| Paul Pierce (22)
| Paul Pierce (12)
| Rajon Rondo (14)
| TD Garden18,624
| 55–24
|- style="background:#fcc;"
| 80
| April 10
| @ Miami
| 
| Paul Pierce (24)
| Glen Davis (8)
| Rajon Rondo (5)
| American Airlines Arena19,766
| 55–25
|- style="background:#fcc;"
| 81
| April 11
| @ Washington
| 
| Glen Davis,Jeff Green (20)
| Jeff Green (15)
| Delonte West (5)
| Verizon Center17,787
| 55–26
|- style="background:#cfc;"
| 82
| April 13
| New York
| 
| Avery Bradley (20)
| Glen Davis,Jeff Green (8)
| Von Wafer (5)
| TD Garden18,624
| 56–26

Playoffs

Game log 

|- style="background:#cfc;"
| 1
| April 17
| New York
| 
| Ray Allen (24)
| Kevin Garnett (13)
| Rajon Rondo (9)
| TD Garden18,624
| 1–0
|- style="background:#cfc;"
| 2
| April 19
| New York
| 
| Rajon Rondo (30)
| Kevin Garnett (10)
| Rajon Rondo (7)
| TD Garden18,624
| 2–0
|- style="background:#cfc;"
| 3
| April 22
| @ New York
| 
| Paul Pierce (38)
| Kevin Garnett (12)
| Rajon Rondo (20)
| Madison Square Garden19,763
| 3–0
|- style="background:#cfc;"
| 4
| April 24
| @ New York
| 
| Kevin Garnett (24)
| Kevin Garnett (9)
| Rajon Rondo (12)
| Madison Square Garden19,763
| 4–0

|- style="background:#fbb;"
| 1
| May 1
| @ Miami
| 
| Ray Allen (25)
| Kevin Garnett (8)
| Rajon Rondo (7)
| American Airlines Arena20,021
| 0–1
|- style="background:#fbb;"
| 2
| May 3
| @ Miami
| 
| Rajon Rondo (20)
| Jermaine O'Neal (9)
| Rajon Rondo (12)
| American Airlines Arena20,104
| 0–2
|- style="background:#cfc;"
| 3
| May 7
| Miami
| 
| Kevin Garnett (28)
| Kevin Garnett (18)
| Rajon Rondo (11)
| TD Garden18,624
| 1–2
|- style="background:#fbb;"
| 4
| May 9
| Miami
| 
| Paul Pierce (27)
| Kevin Garnett (10)
| Rajon Rondo (5)
| TD Garden18,624
| 1–3
|- style="background:#fbb;"
| 5
| May 11
| @ Miami
| 
| Ray Allen (18)
| Kevin Garnett (11)
| Paul Pierce (4)
| American Airlines Arena20,208
| 1–4

Player statistics

Season 

|- style="text-align:center;" bgcolor=""
| 
|style="background:#efe196;color:#008040;"| 80 ||style="background:#efe196;color:#008040;"| 80 || 36.1 || .491 || .444 || .881 || 3.4 || 2.7 || 1.0 || .2 || 16.5
|- style="text-align:center; background:#f0f0f0;"
| *
| 15 || 1 || 12.7 || .314 ||style="background:#efe196;color:#008040;"| .600 || .917 || 1.5 || 1.7 || .5 || .0 || 2.4
|- style="text-align:center;" bgcolor=""
| 
| 31 || 0 || 5.2 || .343 || .000 || .500 || .5 || .4 || .3 || .0 || 1.7
|- style="text-align:center; background:#f0f0f0;"
| *
| 49 || 0 || 19.1 || .491 || .190 || .684 || 2.3 || 1.3 || .8 || .4 || 5.5
|- style="text-align:center;" bgcolor=""
| 
| 78 || 13 || 29.5 || .448 || .133 || .736 || 5.4 || 1.2 || 1.0 || .4 || 11.7
|- style="text-align:center; background:#f0f0f0;"
| *
| 36 || 7 || 14.3 || .604 || .000 || .630 || 2.9 || 0.5 || 0.4 || 0.6 || 4.2
|- style="text-align:center;" bgcolor=""
| 
| 71 || 71 || 31.3 || .528 || .200 || .862 ||style="background:#efe196;color:#008040;"| 8.9 || 2.4 || 1.3 || .8 || 14.9
|- style="text-align:center; background:#f0f0f0;"
| 
| 26 || 2 || 23.4 || .485 || .296 || .794 || 3.3 || .7 || .5 || .6 || 9.8
|- style="text-align:center;" bgcolor=""
| *
| 16 || 0 || 19.1 || .413 || .244 || .778 || 4.3 || .8 || .6 || .6 || 6.9
|- style="text-align:center; background:#f0f0f0;"
| *
| 4 || 0 || 8.0 ||style="background:#efe196;color:#008040;"| .667 || .000 ||style="background:#efe196;color:#008040;"| 1.000 || 1.3 || .3 || .0 || .8 || 1.5
|- style="text-align:center;" bgcolor=""
| *
| 24 || 20 || 23.0 || .537 || .000 || .750 || 5.3 || .3 || .3 || .3 || 9.1
|- style="text-align:center; background:#f0f0f0;"
| *
| 17 || 0 || 10.5 || .421 || .100 || .846 || 2.2 || .4 || .5 || .1 || 2.6
|- style="text-align:center;" bgcolor=""
| 
| 24 || 10 || 18.0 || .459 || .000 || .674 || 3.7 || .5 || .1 ||style="background:#efe196;color:#008040;"| 1.2 || 5.4
|- style="text-align:center; background:#f0f0f0;"
| 
| 37 || 36 || 20.3 ||style="background:#efe196;color:#008040;"| .667 || .000 || .557 || 4.8 || 0.7 || .4 || 1.1 || 9.2
|- style="text-align:center;" bgcolor=""
| *
| 17 || 0 || 8.8 || .462 || .500 || .400 || .8 || .2 || .3 || .0 || 1.8
|- style="text-align:center; background:#f0f0f0;"
| *
| 12 || 7 || 26.1 || .542 || .000 || .575 || 8.1 || .8 || .2 || .8 || 7.3
|- style="text-align:center;" bgcolor=""
| 
|style="background:#efe196;color:#008040;"| 80 ||style="background:#efe196;color:#008040;"| 80 || 34.7 || .497 || .374 || .860 || 5.4 || 3.3 || 1.0 || .6 ||style="background:#efe196;color:#008040;"| 18.9
|- style="text-align:center; background:#f0f0f0;"
| *
| 55 || 11 || 17.9 || .404 || .328 || .825 || 1.6 || 1.9 || .5 || .1 || 7.1
|- style="text-align:center;" bgcolor=""
| 
| 68 || 68 ||style="background:#efe196;color:#008040;"| 37.2 || .475 || .233 || .568 || 4.4 ||style="background:#efe196;color:#008040;"| 11.2 ||style="background:#efe196;color:#008040;"| 2.2 || .2 || 10.6
|- style="text-align:center; background:#f0f0f0;"
| 
| 58 || 2 || 9.5 || .421 || .269 || .842 || .8 || .6 || .3 || .1 || 3.2
|- style="text-align:center;" bgcolor=""
| 
| 24 || 2 || 18.9 || .458 || .364 || .867 || 1.5 || 2.7 || 0.8 || .4 || 5.6
|}

* – Stats with the Celtics.

Awards, records and milestones

Awards

Week/Month 
 On November 1, 2010 Rajon Rondo was named Eastern Conference's Player of the Week (October 26–31).
 On December 1, 2010 Doc Rivers was named Eastern Conference's Coach of the Month (November).
 On December 20, 2010 Paul Pierce was named Eastern Conference's Player of the Week (December 13–19).

All-Star 
 Doc Rivers and his staff earned the right to coach the Eastern Conference team in the All-Star Game.
 Rajon Rondo was selected to his 2nd All-Star Game.
 Ray Allen was selected to his 10th All-Star Game.
 Paul Pierce was selected to his 9th All-Star Game.
 Kevin Garnett was selected to his 14th All-Star Game.

Milestones 
 Paul Pierce becomes the 3rd Celtics player in history to score 20,000 points joining Larry Bird and John Havlicek.
 On January 8, 2011, Boston Celtics joined Los Angeles Lakers to be the only franchises to reach 3,000 wins. They won against Toronto Raptors, 122–102.
 On February 10, 2011, Ray Allen became the NBA's all-time leader in three-point field goals, surpassing Reggie Miller with 2,561.

Transactions

Overview

Trades

Free agents

Additions

Subtractions

References

See also 
 2010–11 NBA season

Boston Celtics seasons
Boston Celtics
Boston Celtics
Boston Celtics
Celtics
Celtics